Marocaster is an extinct genus of sea stars in the family Goniasteridae. It existed in what is now Morocco during the early Cretaceous period. It was described by Daniel B. Blake and Roland Reboul in 2011, and the type species is M. coronatus.

References

Goniasteridae
Fossil taxa described in 2011
Early Cretaceous animals
Fossils of Morocco
Prehistoric starfish genera